The Corduroy Creek Bridge was a steel arch highway bridge on US 60, located near Show Low in Navajo County, Arizona.

History

In 1994 the nearby Cedar Canyon Bridge was substantially widened and upgraded, using the identical arch from the Corduroy Creek bridge to double the width of the Cedar Canyon bridge while rehabilitating the deck structure.

The Corduroy Creek bridge was replaced with an I-beam girder bridge.

See also

List of bridges documented by the Historic American Engineering Record in Arizona
List of bridges on the National Register of Historic Places in Arizona
National Register of Historic Places listings in Navajo County, Arizona

References

External links

Arizona DOT page on Cedar Canyon Bridge widening
Cedar Canyon Bridge widening project

Buildings and structures in Navajo County, Arizona
Open-spandrel deck arch bridges in the United States
Former road bridges in the United States
Steel bridges in the United States
Road bridges on the National Register of Historic Places in Arizona
National Register of Historic Places in Navajo County, Arizona
Transportation in Navajo County, Arizona
Historic American Engineering Record in Arizona
U.S. Route 60
Relocated buildings and structures in Arizona
Bridges of the United States Numbered Highway System
Girder bridges in the United States